John D. MacArthur Beach State Park, named for John D. MacArthur whose Foundation donated a portion of the land for its construction in the 1970s, is located on and just north of Singer Island, Florida in North Palm Beach, Florida. The park was first opened to the public in 1989. The hotel burned to the ground in 1917. Hiking trails and pavilions are open for public use on Munyon Island, which is accessible only by kayak or boat.

One section of the park was popularly known as Air Force Beach from the early 1940s until the renaming of the park because it was used by Palm Beach Air Force Base personnel.  Nude bathing officially ended with the state's takeover of the park in 1982.

MacArthur Beach is a nesting ground for rare sea turtles, including the threatened loggerhead, the endangered green sea turtle, and occasionally the rare leatherback. Many species of birds also visit the park, including peregrine falcons, wood storks, and least terns.  In addition to state funds and gate fees, the park receives community support through a local organization, Friends of MacArthur Beach State Park.

The William T. Kirby Nature Center features exhibits about the park's natural history, and includes live animal exhibits such as two loggerhead sea turtles.

Beach Outfitters Gift Shop and Kayak Rentals, operated by Friends of MacArthur Beach State Park, offers a variety of gifts and provides rentals of kayaks, dive flags, lockers and binoculars.

Gallery

References

External links

 John D. MacArthur Beach State Park at Florida State Parks
 Friends of MacArthur Beach State Park
 John D. MacArthur Beach State Park at Absolutely Florida
 John D. MacArthur Beach State Park at Wildernet

Parks in Palm Beach County, Florida
State parks of Florida
Nature centers in Florida
Protected areas established in 1989
Beaches of Palm Beach County, Florida
Beaches of Florida
1989 establishments in Florida